Teredo may refer to:

 Teredo (bivalve), a genus of shipworms that bores holes in the wood of ships
 Teredo wood, a form of fossilized wood showing marks of shipworm damage 
 Coleophora teredo, a moth of family Coleophoridae
 Teredo tunneling, a protocol in computer communications for transmission of IPv6 datagrams
 HMS Teredo (P338), a British submarine

See also 
 Teredolites